Way of tea  may refer to:

Japanese tea ceremony
Chinese tea ceremony